Prepops rubroscutellatus is a species of plant bug in the family Miridae. It is found in North America.

Subspecies
These two subspecies belong to the species Prepops rubroscutellatus:
 Prepops rubroscutellatus nigriscutis (Knight, 1929)
 Prepops rubroscutellatus rubroscutellatus (Knight, 1929)

References

Further reading

 

Articles created by Qbugbot
Insects described in 1929
Restheniini